The canton of Valençay is an administrative division of the Indre department, central France. Its borders were modified at the French canton reorganisation which came into effect in March 2015. Its seat is in Valençay.

It consists of the following communes:
 
Anjouin
Bagneux
Chabris
Dun-le-Poëlier
Écueillé
Fontguenand
Frédille
Gehée
Heugnes
Jeu-Maloches
Langé
Luçay-le-Mâle
Lye
Menetou-sur-Nahon
Orville
Pellevoisin
Poulaines
Préaux
Saint-Christophe-en-Bazelle
Selles-sur-Nahon
Sembleçay
Valençay
Val-Fouzon
La Vernelle
Veuil
Vicq-sur-Nahon
Villegouin
Villentrois-Faverolles-en-Berry

References

Cantons of Indre